John Joseph Ryan (17 June 1927 – 3 April 2014) was an Irish Labour Party politician from Nenagh, County Tipperary. He was an unsuccessful candidate at the 1969 general election, but was elected to Dáil Éireann at the 1973 general election as a Teachta Dála (TD) for the Tipperary North constituency. He was re-elected at each subsequent general election until he lost his seat at the 1987 general election. 

He was elected to the Industrial and Commercial Panel of the 19th Seanad in 1989. At the 1992 general election he re-gained his Dáil seat in Tipperary North. He retired at the 1997 general election. He served as Leas-Cheann Comhairle (deputy chairperson) of the Dáil from 1982 to 1987. He died in 2014 at the age of 86.

References

1927 births
2014 deaths
Local councillors in North Tipperary
Labour Party (Ireland) TDs
Members of the 20th Dáil
Members of the 21st Dáil
Members of the 22nd Dáil
Members of the 23rd Dáil
Members of the 24th Dáil
Members of the 27th Dáil
Members of the 19th Seanad
Politicians from County Tipperary
Labour Party (Ireland) senators